The Winter Festival of Lights in Niagara Falls, Ontario, is Canada's largest lights festival. It runs from mid-November to mid-January and attracts over one million visitors annually. It features a beautifully decorated five-kilometre route along the Niagara Parkway, adjacent to Niagara Falls.

History
The Winter Festival of Lights was founded in 1982 with the mandate of developing tourism in Niagara Falls during the winter months  by the Niagara Falls Canada Visitor and Convention Bureau (now Niagara Falls Tourism), the City of Niagara Falls, The Niagara Parks Commission and numerous local businesses.

In 2013, Disney and The Winter Festival of Lights mutually decided to end their relationship after two decades of partnership on the event. In 2005 and 2007, the Festival was chosen as a Top 100 Internationally Known Event by the American Bus Association while its website and programme won "Best in Class" awards from Festivals and Events Ontario). In 2018, the Winter Festival of Lights received the Event of the Year Award at the Canadian Tourism Awards presented by Tourism Industry Association of Canada (TIAC).

References

External links
Winter Festival of Lights website

Culture of Niagara Falls, Ontario
Winter festivals in Canada